Ravi Yadav is an Indian cinematographer known for his works with directors, Abbas–Mustan and R. K. Selvamani, in the Hindi and Tamil film industries, respectively. He started doing cinematography for Films, even before completing his Diploma in Cinematography from MGR Film Institute, Chennai.  He started shooting Tamil feature films with his batch mates and friends.  Ravi did his debut film independently, without assisting any film maker or cinematographer. He also produced two Tamil films and later moved into Bollywood.  His collaboration with Bollywood director duo Abbas and Mustan Burmawalla brought out notable Hindi films like Humraaz, Taarzan, Aitraaz, 36 China Town, Naqaab, Race 1, Players, Race 2.

Filmography

References

http://www.indianexpress.com/news/snipshot/759826/2

External links 

Official Website: http://raviyadavfilms.com

Living people
Tamil film cinematographers
M.G.R. Government Film and Television Training Institute alumni
Hindi film cinematographers
Cinematographers from Tamil Nadu
Year of birth missing (living people)